Marin (also Maryn) Varbanov (Марин Върбанов; 20 September 1932 – 22 July 1989) was born in Oryachovo, Bulgaria, and was a Bulgarian painter and modern tapestriest.

References

http://socbg.com/2018/10/%D0%BB%D1%8E%D0%B1%D0%BE%D0%B2%D1%82%D0%B0-%D0%BC%D0%B5%D0%B6%D0%B4%D1%83-%D1%81%D1%83%D0%BD-%D0%B8-%D0%BC%D0%B0%D1%80%D0%B8%D0%BD-%D0%B5-%D0%BB%D0%B5%D0%B3%D0%B5%D0%BD%D0%B4%D0%B0-%D0%B2-%D0%BA%D0%B8.html

External links
More for Marin Varbanov
Marin Varbanov's family, story and works
Marin Varbanov - Beijing
Bulgarian newspaper "Kultura" for Marin Varbanov
Vassilchina for Marin Varbanov
Photo of the artist
Photo and text about Marin Varbanov 75 anniversary in Oryachovo

1932 births
1989 deaths
Bulgarian artists
People from Oryahovo